Donna Simpson may refer to:

Donna Simpson (internet celebrity), an American internet celebrity
Donna Simpson (musician), an Australian musician